WinWAP was a web browser for Windows CE mobile devices. It was first released in 1999.

See also
 Article about Winwap in Finnish IT Magazine Tietoviikko

Windows web browsers
Mobile web browsers
1999 software
Discontinued web browsers